Sidi Mardoum Mosque was a Tunisian mosque located in the north-east of the medina of Tunis.
It does not exist anymore.

Localization
The mosque was located in Sidi Mardoum Street in the Hara hood, near Bab Cartagena, one of the gates of the Medina that got destroyed.

Etymology
It got its name from a saint, Sidi Mardoum.

References 

Mosques in Tunis